Sublimity is a concept in philosophy.

Sublimity may also refer to:

Sublimity City, Kentucky, U.S.
Sublimity, Oregon, U.S.
Sublimity (album), by Transmission, 2008
Sublimity (horse) (foaled 2000)

See also 
 Sublime (disambiguation)
 Sublimation (disambiguation)